Heino Eller (7 March 1887 – 16 June 1970) was an Estonian composer and pedagogue, known as the founder of contemporary Estonian symphonic music.

Life
Eller was born in Tartu, where he took private lessons in violin and music theory, played in several ensembles and orchestras, and performed as violin soloist. In 1907 he entered the Saint Petersburg Conservatory to study violin. From 1908 to 1911 he was a law student. In 1920 Eller graduated from the conservatory renamed to Petrograd Conservatory. His younger brother was sculptor Aleksander Eller.

From 1920 to 1940, Eller was a professor of music theory and composition at the Tartu Higher School for Music. During this time he formed the Tartu school of composition, which gave rise to many composers, including Eduard Tubin. In 1940 he became a professor of composition at the Tallinn Conservatory and taught there until his death in 1970.

Eller was a teacher of composition. The school he formed in Tartu counterbalanced the so-called Tallinn school headed by Artur Kapp. Eller's pedagogical talent is versatile. The list of his pupils offers the best proof of this: each of them has created a distinguished original style. Among his students were Eduard Tubin, Villem Kapp, Kaljo Raid, Boris Kõrver, Anatoli Garshnek, Leo Normet, Valter Ojakäär, Uno Naissoo, Arne Oit, Jaan Rääts, Heino Jürisalu, Arvo Pärt, Alo Põldmäe, Lepo Sumera, Boris Parsadanian, Alfred Karindi, Eduard Oja, Olav Roots and Karl Leichter.

Selected works

Eller primarily composed instrumental music. His symphonic works, especially Koit and Videvik, break new ground for Estonian symphonic music. His musical language contains many national traits, but he was influenced by 20th-century styles as diverse as impressionism and expressionism.

 Koit (Dawn), tone poem (1915–1918, 1920)
 Videvik (Twilight), tone poem (1917)
 Moderato sostenuto in D minor for voice, viola and piano (1921)
 Elegia for harp and string orchestra (1931)
 Concerto in B minor for violin and orchestra (1937)
 Five Pieces for string orchestra (1953)

Family
Heino Eller was married to pianist Anna Kremer who was executed at a concentration camp by German occupational authorities in 1942 because of her Jewish ethnicity.

Bibliography
 Mart Humal, Reet Remmel. Heino Eller in modo mixolydio. Tallinn: Eesti Teatri- ja Muusikamuuseum: SE&JS, 2008. ,

References

External links

 Heino Eller at the Estonian Music Information Centre

1887 births
1970 deaths
People from Tartu
People from Kreis Dorpat
20th-century classical composers
20th-century Estonian composers
20th-century male musicians
20th-century violinists
Estonian violinists
Soviet composers
Soviet male composers
Male classical composers
Saint Petersburg Conservatory alumni
People's Artists of the USSR
People's Artists of the Estonian Soviet Socialist Republic
Recipients of the Order of Lenin
Recipients of the Order of the Red Banner of Labour
Burials at Metsakalmistu